Oncozygia is a genus of shield bugs in the family Pentatomidae. There is one described species in Oncozygia, O. clavicornis.

References

Further reading

 
 

Pentatomidae genera
Articles created by Qbugbot
Podopinae